Nguyễn Thị Huyên (1441 – 1505) was a queen consort of Later Lê dynasty. She was the wife of emperor Lê Thánh Tông and mother of emperor Lê Hiến Tông.

Biography
Empress Nguyễn Thị Huyên was born in 1441 at Gia Miêu outer village, Tống Sơn district, Hà Trung local government, Thanh Hoa town. She was the daughter of the Duke Nguyễn Công Lộ and foster daughter of the officer Nguyễn Đức Trung. She has entered Lê dynasty's palace on July 1460 with rank Sung-nghi (充儀), lived at the palace of Vĩnh Ninh.

See also
 Lê Thánh Tông
 Lê Hiến Tông

References

 

1441 births
1505 deaths
Lê dynasty empresses dowager
15th-century Vietnamese women
16th-century Vietnamese women